The SIPA S.1000 Coccinelle was a French-built light civil utility aircraft of the 1950s.

Design
The Coccinelle was designed by Yves Gardan for SIPA as a very low cost all-metal trainer of very simple construction, intended for aero club use. It was a two-seat side-by-side low-winged aircraft with fixed-tricycle undercarriage and incorporated a number of standard automobile parts.

Production and service

The prototype first flew on 11 June 1955. Series production by Société Industrielle pour l'Aéronautique (SIPA) was planned to commence in 1956, but only two further examples were completed with the last being exported to Argentina.

In 2001, the first and third aircraft remained airworthy in France and Argentina, respectively. By 2010 F-BHHL no longer appeared on the French civil register, but in March 2013 LV-GFG remained active in Argentina.

Specifications (S.1000 Coccinelle)

References

Notes

Bibliography

1950s French civil utility aircraft
S1000
Single-engined tractor aircraft
Low-wing aircraft
Aircraft first flown in 1955